Karina Metelkova (born 11 May 2003) is Russian group rhythmic gymnast. She is the 2021 European Group All-around champion.

Career

Senior 
In 2020, Karina joined Russian National Reserve Team as a senior group gymnast. Reserve group took part in Grand Prix Tartu in February. Karina and her teammates placed second in Group All-Around competition after Uzbekistan and took gold medals in both Apparatus Finals. In October, Russian Federation organized 2nd Online Tournament in rhythmic gymnastics, where reserve group won in Group All-Around competition (69.050) in front of Uzbekistan.
In the end of May 2021, she competed at the 2021 Pesaro World Cup, her first World Cup, where she won gold medal in Group All-around and two silver medals in Apparatus finals. In June, she competed at the 2021 European Championships in Varna, Bulgaria and won gold medal in Group All-around and Team competition and silver in 5 Balls final.  In July, the national coach Irina Viner, announced that the fifth place of the Russian group that will compete in the Olympic Games of Tokyo 2020, will be occupied by Alisa Tishchenko, leaving out Metelkova and Olya Karaseva

References

External links
 
 

2003 births
Living people
Russian rhythmic gymnasts
Medalists at the Rhythmic Gymnastics European Championships
Sportspeople from Yaroslavl
21st-century Russian women